The Three-fifths Compromise was an agreement reached during the 1787 United States Constitutional Convention over the inclusion of slaves in a state's total population.  This count would determine the number of seats in the House of Representatives; the number of electoral votes each state would be allocated; and how much money the states would pay in taxes. The compromise counted three-fifths of each state's slave population toward that state's total population for the purpose of apportioning the House of Representatives. Even though slaves were denied voting rights, this gave Southern states more representatives and more presidential electoral votes than if slaves had not been counted. It also gave slaveholders similarly enlarged powers in Southern legislatures; this was an issue in the secession of West Virginia from Virginia in 1863. Free blacks and indentured servants were not subject to the compromise, and each was counted as one full person for representation.

In the United States Constitution, the Three-fifths Compromise is part of Article 1, Section 2, Clause 3. 
Section 2 of the Fourteenth Amendment (1868) later superseded this clause and explicitly repealed the compromise.

Text
In the U.S. Constitution, the Three-fifths Compromise is part of Article 1, Section 2, Clause 3:

Drafting and ratification in the Constitution

Confederation Congress
The three-fifths ratio originated with an amendment proposed to the Articles of Confederation on April 18, 1783. The amendment was to have changed the basis for determining the wealth of each state, and hence its tax obligations, from real estate to population, as a measure of ability to produce wealth. The proposal by a committee of the Congress had suggested that taxes "shall be supplied by the several colonies in proportion to the number of inhabitants of every age, sex, and quality, except Indians not paying taxes". The South immediately objected to this formula since it would include slaves, who were viewed primarily as property, in calculating the amount of taxes to be paid. As Thomas Jefferson wrote in his notes on the debates, the Southern states would be taxed "according to their numbers and their wealth conjunctly, while the northern would be taxed on numbers only".

After proposed compromises of one-half by Benjamin Harrison of Virginia and three-fourths by several New Englanders failed to gain sufficient support, Congress finally settled on the three-fifths ratio proposed by James Madison. But this amendment ultimately failed, falling two states short of the unanimous approval required to amend the Articles of Confederation (New Hampshire and New York opposed it).

Federalist Papers 54-55
James Madison and Alexander Hamilton explained the reasoning for the 3/5 in Federalist No. 54 "The Apportionment of Members Among the States" (February 12, 1788) as: 

"We subscribe to the doctrine," might one of our Southern brethren observe, "that representation relates more immediately to persons, and taxation more immediately to property, and we join in the application of this distinction to the case of our slaves. But we must deny the fact, that slaves are considered merely as property, and in no respect whatever as persons. The true state of the case is, that they partake of both these qualities: being considered by our laws, in some respects, as persons, and in other respects as property...Let the case of the slaves be considered, as it is in truth, a peculiar one. Let the compromising expedient of the Constitution be mutually adopted, which regards them as inhabitants, but as debased by servitude below the equal level of free inhabitants, which regards the SLAVE as divested of two fifths of the MAN...The federal Constitution, therefore, decides with great propriety on the case of our slaves, when it views them in the mixed character of persons and of property. This is in fact their true character. It is the character bestowed on them by the laws under which they live; and it will not be denied, that these are the proper criterion; because it is only under the pretext that the laws have transformed the negroes into subjects of property, that a place is disputed them in the computation of numbers; and it is admitted, that if the laws were to restore the rights which have been taken away, the negroes could no longer be refused an equal share of representation with the other inhabitants. 

They later expanded further in Federalist No. 55 "The Total Number of the House of Representatives" (February 15, 1788) as explaining that the 3/5 had to do with estimating the population size of slaves at the time as well:

Within three years a census is to be taken, when the number may be augmented to one for every thirty thousand inhabitants; and within every successive period of ten years the census is to be renewed, and augmentations may continue to be made under the above limitation. It will not be thought an extravagant conjecture that the first census will, at the rate of one for every thirty thousand, raise the number of representatives to at least one hundred. Estimating the negroes in the proportion of three fifths, it can scarcely be doubted that the population of the United States will by that time, if it does not already, amount to three millions.

Constitutional Convention
During the Constitutional Convention, the compromise was proposed by delegate James Wilson and seconded by Charles Pinckney.

When he presented his plan for the frame of government to the Convention on its first day, Charles Pinckney of South Carolina proposed that for the purposes of apportionment, a "House of Delegates" be determined through the apportionment of "one Member for every thousand Inhabitants 3/5 of Blacks included." The Convention unanimously accepted the principle that representation in the House of Representatives would be in proportion to the relative state populations, but it initially rejected his proposal regarding apportionment of the black population along with the rest of his plan. However, since slaves could not vote, leaders in slave states would thus have the benefit of increased representation in the House and the Electoral College. Delegates opposed to slavery proposed that only free inhabitants of each state be counted for apportionment purposes, while delegates supportive of slavery opposed the proposal, wanting slaves to count in their actual numbers.

The proposal to count slaves by a three-fifths ratio was first presented on June 11, and agreed to by nine states to two with only a brief debate. It was debated at length between July 9 and 13 (inclusive) when it was initially voted down by the members present at the Convention six to four. A few Southern delegates, seeing an opportunity, then proposed full representation for their slave population; most states voted no. Seeing that the states could not remain united about counting the slaves as five-fifths without some sort of compromise measure, the ratio of three-fifths was brought back to the table and agreed to by eight states to two.

Debate

Gouverneur Morris from New York doubted that a direct tax, whose burden on Southern states would be increased by the Three-fifths Compromise, could be effectively leveled on the vast United States. The primary ways of generating federal revenue, he said, would be excise taxes and import duties, which would tax the North more than the South; therefore, the taxation provision was irrelevant, and the compromise would only increase the number of pro-slavery legislators.

Northern delegates argued only voters should be accounted for. Southern delegates countered, claiming slaves counted just as much as voters, despite Northerners questioning why slaves should be held by Southerners.

Compromise and enactment
After a contentious debate, the compromise that was finally agreed upon—of counting "all other persons" as only three-fifths of their actual numbers—reduced the representation of the slave states relative to the original proposals, but improved it over the Northern position. An inducement for slave states to accept the Compromise was its tie to taxation in the same ratio, so that the burden of taxation on the slave states was also reduced.

A contentious issue at the 1787 Constitutional Convention was whether slaves would be counted as part of the population in determining representation of the states in the Congress or would instead be considered property and, as such, not be considered for purposes of representation. Delegates from states with a large population of slaves argued that slaves should be considered persons in determining representation, but as property if the new government were to levy taxes on the states on the basis of population. Delegates from states where slavery had become rare argued that slaves should be included in taxation, but not in determining representation.

The proposed ratio was, however, a ready solution to the impasse that arose during the Constitutional Convention. In that situation, the alignment of the contending forces was the reverse of what had been obtained under the Articles of Confederation in 1783. In amending the Articles, the North wanted slaves to count for more than the South did because the objective was to determine taxes paid by the states to the federal government. In the Constitutional Convention, the more important issue was representation in Congress, so the South wanted slaves to count for more than the North did.

Before the Civil War
By including three-fifths of slaves (who had no voting rights) in the legislative apportionment, the Three-fifths Compromise provided additional representation in the House of Representatives of slave states compared to the free states. In 1793, for example, Southern slave states had 47 of the 105 seats, but would have had 33 had seats been assigned based on free populations. In 1812, slave states had 76 seats out of 143 instead of the 59 they would have had; in 1833, 98 seats out of 240, instead of 73. As a result, Southern states had additional influence on the presidency, the speakership of the House, and the Supreme Court until the American Civil War. In addition, the Southern states' insistence on equal numbers of slave and free states, which was maintained until 1850, safeguarded the Southern bloc in the Senate as well as Electoral College votes.

Historian Garry Wills has speculated that without the additional slave state votes, Jefferson would have lost the presidential election of 1800. Also, "slavery would have been excluded from Missouri ... Jackson's Indian removal policy would have failed ... the Wilmot Proviso would have banned slavery in territories won from Mexico ... the Kansas-Nebraska bill would have failed." While the Three-fifths Compromise could be seen to favor Southern states because of their large slave populations, for example, the Connecticut Compromise tended to favor the Northern states (which were generally smaller). Support for the new Constitution rested on the balance of these sectional interests.

Debate
Before the Civil War aspects of the Constitution were subject for significant debate by abolitionists.  The Garrisonian view (William Lloyd Garrison (1805–1879), a prominent American abolitionist best known for his widely read anti-slavery newspaper The Liberator of the 1830s) of the Constitution was that it was a pro-slavery document and only completely dividing the Union could satisfy the cause of anti-slavery.

Following a bitter series of public debates including one with George Thompson, Frederick Douglass took another view, pointing to the Constitution as an anti-slavery document:

But giving the provisions the very worse construction, what does it amount to? I answer—It is a downright disability laid upon the slaveholding States; one which deprives those States of two-fifths of their natural basis of representation. A black man in a free State is worth just two-fifths more than a black man in a slave State, as a basis of political power under the Constitution. Therefore, instead of encouraging slavery, the Constitution encourages freedom by giving an increase of “two-fifths” of political power to free over slave States. So much for the three-fifths clause; taking it at is worst, it still leans to freedom, not slavery; for, be it remembered that the Constitution nowhere forbids a coloured man to vote.Frederick Douglass, p. 194

After the Civil War
Section 2 of the Fourteenth Amendment (1868) later superseded Article 1, Section 2, Clause 3 and explicitly repealed the compromise. It provides that "representatives shall be apportioned ... counting the whole number of persons in each State, excluding Indians not taxed." A later provision of the same clause reduced the Congressional representation of states who denied the right to vote to adult male citizens, but this provision was never effectively enforced. (The Thirteenth Amendment, passed in 1865, had already eliminated almost all persons from the original clause's jurisdiction by banning slavery; the only remaining persons subject to it were those sentenced for a crime to penal servitude, which the amendment excluded from the ban.)

After the Reconstruction Era came to an end in 1877, the former slave states subverted the objective of these changes by using terrorism and other illegal tactics to disenfranchise their black citizens, while obtaining the benefit of apportionment of representatives on the basis of the total populations. These measures effectively gave white Southerners even greater voting power than they had in the antebellum era, inflating the number of Southern Democrats in the House of Representatives as well as the number of votes they could exercise in the Electoral College in the election of the president.

The disenfranchisement of black citizens eventually attracted the attention of Congress, and, in 1900, some members proposed stripping the South of seats, related to the number of people who were barred from voting. In the end, Congress did not act to change apportionment, largely because of the power of the Southern bloc. The Southern bloc comprised Southern Democrats voted into office by white voters and constituted a powerful voting bloc in Congress until the 1960s. Their representatives, re-elected repeatedly by one-party states, controlled numerous chairmanships of important committees in both houses on the basis of seniority, giving them control over rules, budgets and important patronage projects, among other issues. Their power allowed them to defeat federal legislation against racial violence and abuses in the South, until overcome by the civil rights movement.

See also

 Fugitive Slave Act of 1793
 Emancipation Proclamation
 Section 127 of the Australian Constitution, excluding Australian Aboriginals from the census for purposes of determining allocation of seats in Parliament

Citations

Bibliography

Books

Papers

 
 
 
 
 
 
 
 
 

Drafting of the United States Constitution
Slavery in the United States
History of African-American civil rights
1787 in the United States
1787 in American politics
Political compromises in the United States
Expansion of slavery in the United States
United States federal slavery legislation